Ilbenge (İlbeŋe) is a rural locality (a selo), the administrative centre of and one of three settlements, in addition to Arylakh and Sortol, in Bappagayinsky Rural Okrug of Vilyuysky District in the Sakha Republic, Russia. Its population as of the 2010 Census was 651. of whom 306 were male and 345 female, down from 685 as recorded during the 2002 Census.

References

Notes

Sources
Official website of the Sakha Republic. Registry of the Administrative-Territorial Divisions of the Sakha Republic. Vilyuysky District. 

Rural localities in Vilyuysky District